Hamples Corner is an unincorporated community in the town of Center, Outagamie County, Wisconsin, United States. It is situated at the intersection of County Highway O and Hample Road.

Geography
Hamples Corner is located at  (44.35, -88.466667). Its elevation is 793 feet (241.7m).

Transportation

References

Unincorporated communities in Outagamie County, Wisconsin
Unincorporated communities in Wisconsin